Handy Andy may refer to:

 Handy Andy (1921 film), a British film directed by Bert Wynne
 Handy Andy (1934 film), a 1934 film starring Will Rogers
 Handy Andy (comic strip), a strip in the British comic Krazy
 Handy Andy, an 1841 book by Samuel Lover
 Handy Andy Home Improvement Center, a defunct big box hardware store
 Andy Kane, carpenter in the BBC DIY TV show Changing Rooms
 Andy Phillip (1922–2001), American basketball player
 A character in the Australian television series Fam Time
 Handy Andy grocery chain, purchased by the Texas-based grocery distributor Grocers Supply